Venation may refer to:

 Venation (botany), the arrangement of veins in leaves
 Wing venation, the arrangement of veins in insect wings

See also

 Vernation, the arrangement of leaves in a bud

Biology disambiguation pages